Frío or Frio may refer to:


Places
 Frio River, Texas, United States
 Frio County, Texas, United States
 Frio Town, Texas, United States, known as Frio City

Music
 Frio (musician), stage name of Edwin Rojas Restrepo, a Colombian singer-songwriter born in New York 
 Frío (album), a 1994 Spanish-language album by Robi Draco Rosa
 "Frío (song)", a song by Ricky Martin from his 2011 album Música + Alma + Sexo
 "Frío", a song by Fey from her 2012 album Primera Fila

Other uses
 Frio (Smart Card), a ticketing scheme operated by British Trentbarton buses

See also 
 Rio Frio (disambiguation)